Davy Crockett Lake is a  impounded body of water  in the Caddo National Grassland on Dixon and Sandy creeks. The lake has two geographical fingers, known as Crockett East and Crockett West. It was developed in 1935 under the National Industry Recovery Act. It is also known as Lake Crockett. Stocked fish include largemouth bass, channel catfish, crappie and bluegill.

References

 

Reservoirs in Texas
Davy Crockett
Bodies of water of Fannin County, Texas